David Ritchie (August 19, 1812 – January 24, 1867) was a Whig, Opposition Party and Republican member of the U.S. House of Representatives from Pennsylvania.

Biography
Born in Canonsburg, Pennsylvania on August 19, 1812, Ritchie graduated from Jefferson College in Canonsburg in 1829, and subsequently from a university in Heidelberg, Germany. He studied law, was admitted to the bar in 1835 and began his legal practice in Pittsburgh, Pennsylvania.

Ritchie was elected as a Whig to the Thirty-third Congress, reelected as an Opposition Party candidate to the Thirty-fourth Congress, and elected as a Republican to the Thirty-fifth Congress.  He served as chairman of the United States House Committee on Revolutionary Claims during the Thirty-fourth Congress.

He was appointed associate judge of the court of common pleas of Allegheny County, Pennsylvania, in 1862 and served nine months.

Following the end of his legislative career, Ritchie resumed the practice of law.

Death
Ritchie died in Pittsburgh on January 24, 1867.

References

1812 births
1867 deaths
People from Canonsburg, Pennsylvania
Pennsylvania Whigs
Whig Party members of the United States House of Representatives
Opposition Party members of the United States House of Representatives from Pennsylvania
Republican Party members of the United States House of Representatives from Pennsylvania
Pennsylvania lawyers
Washington & Jefferson College alumni
19th-century American politicians
19th-century American judges
19th-century American lawyers
Judges of the Pennsylvania Courts of Common Pleas